Cosmocampus arctus (snubnose pipefish) is a species of marine fish of the family Syngnathidae. It is found from Tomales Bay, California, to Mazatlan, Mexico, and throughout the Gulf of California. It lives on rocky or coral reefs, among eelgrass and other seaweeds, and among algae. It inhabits depths to 10m, where it can grow to lengths of 12 cm. This species is ovoviviparous, with males carrying eggs in a brood pouch before giving birth to live young. Monogamous mating has also been observed in this species.

References

Further reading

Discover Life
WoRMS

arctus
Marine fish
Taxa named by Oliver Peebles Jenkins
Taxa named by Barton Warren Evermann
Fish described in 1946
Fish of the Western United States
Fish of the Pacific Ocean